Bernard-Gabriel Seurre or Seurre the Elder (11 July 1795 – 3 October 1867) was a French sculptor. His younger brother Charles Émile Seurre (1798–1858) was also a sculptor.

Life 

Born in Paris, Bernard Seurre was a student of the sculptor Pierre Cartellier. In 1818 Bernard Seurre won the Prix de Rome for sculpture with a relief on the subject Chilonis imploring mercy for her husband Cleombrotus<ref>Cleombrotus married Chilonis, daughter of Leonidas II, king of Lacedemonia, and shortly after the marriage usurped Leonidas' throne and condemned him to exile. Cleombrotus did not last long in power and the Lacedomnians, tired of his tyrannical government, recalled Leonidas. He returned and wanted to punish Cleombrotus, who took refuge in the temple of Neptune. Leonidas went to the temple with friends and soldiers intent on killing Cleombrotus, but Chilonis took one of her children to see Leonidas and asked for mercy from him. (Plutarch, Life of Agis, chapters 16-18)</ref> He then produced sculptures for the Arc de Triomphe between 1833 and 1836 and produced a design for a sculpture on top of it in 1833 (though this was never realized).

He died in Paris.

 Works 

Arc de triomphe
 The Battle of Aboukir, bas-relief, stone, east façade (champs-Élysées side), above The Apotheosis of Napoleon I and The Triumph of 1810 by Jean-Pierre Cortot
 Entablature frieze, west façade (avenue de la Grande-Armée side), right half
 Entablature frieze, south façade (avenue Kléber side), left half
 Design for sculpture on top of the Arc de triomphe - allegory of France victorious (1833), drawing, Paris, musée d'Orsay

Other
 Molière standing in meditation, over-life-size, bronze, Paris, Musée du Louvre
 Molière, bronze, Paris, 1844, fontaine Molière, junction of rue de Richelieu and la rue Molière
 Jean de La Fontaine, statue, marble, Paris, palais de l'Institut
 Modesty, statue, Paris, cimetière du Père-Lachaise, tomb of Pierre Cartellier, left side
 Portrait of Nicolas Béhuchet, admiral of France, died 1340 (vers 1838), bust, plaster, Versailles, châteaux de Versailles et de Trianon

 Sources 

  Pierre Kjellberg, Le Nouveau guide des statues de Paris, La Bibliothèque des Arts, Paris, 1988.
  Emmanuel Schwartz, Les Sculptures de l'École des Beaux-Arts de Paris. Histoire, doctrines, catalogue, École nationale supérieure des Beaux-Arts, Paris, 2003.
  Charles Reutlinger, Portrait de Bernard Gabriel Seurre'', photographs, Paris, musée d'Orsay

References 

1795 births
1867 deaths
19th-century French sculptors
French male sculptors
19th-century French male artists